Regulator of G-protein signaling 6 is a protein that in humans is encoded by the RGS6 gene.

Members of the RGS (regulator of G protein signaling) family have been shown to modulate the functioning of G proteins by activating the intrinsic GTPase activity of the alpha (guanine nucleotide-binding) subunits.[supplied by OMIM]

Interactions 

RGS6 has been shown to interact with STMN2 and DMAP1.

References

Further reading